József Jacsó is a Hungarian weightlifter. He won a Silver medal in the Heavyweight 110kg class at the 1988 Summer Olympics in Seoul.

References 

1962 births
Living people
Olympic weightlifters of Hungary
Weightlifters at the 1988 Summer Olympics
Olympic silver medalists for Hungary
Dynamo sports society athletes
Olympic medalists in weightlifting
Medalists at the 1988 Summer Olympics
Hungarian male weightlifters
20th-century Hungarian people